Distributed active transformer is a circuit topology that allows low-voltage transistors to be used to generate large amounts of RF (radio frequency) power. Its main use has been in making integrated CMOS power amplifier for wireless applications, such as GSM/GPRS cellular phones.

At the time it was introduced, the distributed active transformer performance improved more than an order of magnitude relative to the previous state of the art.

Output power of up to 2.2 Watt in S-band was demonstrated back in 2002, utilizing Distributed active transformer which combine the power of four differential power amplifiers.

References

External links

 Thesis - Distributed Active Transformer for Integrated Power Amplification - Ichiro Aoki (2002) - California Institute of Technology
 Aoki, I.; Kee, S.; Magoon, R.; Aparicio, R.; Bohn, F.; Zachan, J.; Hatcher, G.; McClymont, D.; Hajimiri, A.; "A Integrated Quad-Band GSM/GPRS CMOS Power Amplifier"; Solid-State Circuits, IEEE Journal of; Dec. 2008 
 Aoki, I.; Kee, S.D.; Rutledge, D.B.; Hajimiri, A.; "Fully Integrated CMOS Power Amplifier Design Using the Distributed Active-Transformer Architecture"; Solid-State Circuits, IEEE Journal of; Mar. 2002    
 Aoki, I.; Kee, S.D.; Rutledge, D.B.; Hajimiri, A.; "Distributed Active Transformer - A New Power-Combining and Impedance-Transformation Technique";  Microwave Theory and Techniques, IEEE Transactions in January 2002 
  

Electronic circuits